Suede (pronounced  ) is a type of leather with a fuzzy, napped finish, commonly used for jackets, shoes, fabrics, purses, furniture, and other items. The term comes from the French , which literally means "gloves from Sweden". The term was first used by The Oxford English Dictionary in 1884. 

Suede is made from the underside of the animal skin, which is softer and more pliable than the outer skin layer, though not as durable.

Production

Suede leather is made from the underside of the skin, primarily from lamb, although goat, calf, and deer are commonly used. Splits from thick hides of cow and deer are also sueded, but, due to the fiber content, have a shaggy nap.

Characteristics

Because suede does not include the tough exterior skin layer, it is less durable, but softer, than the standard "full-grain" leather. Its softness, thinness, and pliability make it suitable for clothing and delicate uses; suede was originally used for women's gloves, hence its etymology (see above). Suede leather is also popular in upholstery, shoes, bags, and other accessories, and as a lining for other leather products. Due to its textured nature and open pores, suede may become dirty and quickly absorb liquids.

In popular culture 

 Suede's absorbent nature was highlighted in the Seinfeld episode "The Jacket", in which Jerry ventures outside into the snow and ruins his exorbitantly priced suede jacket.
 "Blue Suede Shoes" is a well-known early rock-n-roll song written by Carl Perkins and also covered by Elvis Presley.
 "Weird Al" Yankovic wrote and performed the song "King of Suede".
 "Suedehead" A skinhead subculture and song by English singer/songwriter "Morrissey".

See also 
Nap (fabric)
Shearing (textiles)
Nubuck
Voris, 1930s–1940s American fashion designer who worked exclusively in suede

References

Further reading

External links 
 

Leather
Textile techniques